Marc Rojas (born 16 February 1994) is a Dominican Republic swimmer. He competed in the men's 50 metre breaststroke event at the 2017 World Aquatics Championships.

References

1994 births
Living people
Dominican Republic male swimmers
Place of birth missing (living people)
Male breaststroke swimmers